The Aaron Monument is a public art work by artist Brian Maughan.  It is located in front of the American Family Field stadium west of downtown Milwaukee, Wisconsin, United States.

Description 
The sculpture depicts Hank Aaron, a member of the Milwaukee Brewers baseball team, in a batting stance. The figure wears the uniform of the winners of the 1957 World Series: long socks, loose-fitting knee-length pants, a button-front short-sleeved jersey and a cap. The sculpture was dedicated on April 5, 2001.

References

2001 establishments in Wisconsin
2001 sculptures
Bronze sculptures in Wisconsin
Cultural depictions of American men
Cultural depictions of baseball players
Monuments and memorials in Wisconsin
Outdoor sculptures in Milwaukee
Sculptures of African Americans
Sculptures of men in Wisconsin
Statues in Wisconsin
Statues of sportspeople